James Golden, also known by his pseudonym Bo Snerdley, (born c. 1955) is a talk radio producer, call screener, and radio host best known for working 30 years with The Rush Limbaugh Show. Since 2001 he has been a producer/executive for Premiere Networks (formerly Premiere Radio Networks), the largest radio syndication company in the United States. He currently hosts an afternoon drive-time radio program on WABC, New York.

Biography
He attended City University of New York-Queens College from 1973 to 1976.

In his early twenties, Snerdley worked at radio station WWRL as a marketing and research director and later served as the radio station's first music research director.  From 1992 to 1998, Snerdley co-hosted (with Joel Santisteban) a political call-in show, The James and Joel Show, on WABC radio in New York.

Snerdley was part of the production team on the Rush Limbaugh television program, which aired from 1992 through 1996

From 1998 to 2001, Snerdley served as vice-president for programming at Talkspot.com, where he also hosted two Internet radio programs. He occasionally contributes written political commentary online.

Although Snerdley worked from a control booth off the air with Limbaugh, a 2008 New York Times Magazine profile of Limbaugh reported that during the show, Golden "banters with and occasionally badgers Limbaugh via an internal talk-back circuit" (an IFB). On occasion, Snerdley has been accorded airtime on the program. In February 2008, Golden, who is black, was assigned (as Snerdley) a satirical cameo role by Limbaugh as the show's Official Criticizer of Barack Obama (Snerdley has introduced himself as an "African-American-in-good-standing-and-certified-black-enough-to-criticize-Obama guy," and declared that he was speaking, "on behalf of our E.I.B. brothers and sisters in the hood."); the role became an occasionally recurring feature during Obama's presidency.

He is a senior partner of Golden Creative Communications, LLC.

After Limbaugh's death in February 2021, Snerdley was still credited as the show's producer for the replacement hosts, and is also involved in publication of Limbaugh's ongoing (as of June 2021) newsletter. In May 2021, he launched a podcast Rush Limbaugh: The Man Behind the Golden EIB Microphone on IHeart Radio. On August 23, 2021, Golden (under his Bo Snerdley alias) returned to WABC and sister station WLIR-FM to host a 4:00-5:00 afternoon show and Saturdays 8:00-10:00 am.

James is the author of the book, Rush On The Radio: A Tribute From His Sidekick of 30 Years, which was published in November 2021.

In a 2021 interview, Snerdley admitted that his pseudonym "Bo Snerdley" was inspired by Bo Jackson.

See also

 Black conservatism in the United States
 List of African-American Republicans

Sources
 "Late Period Limbaugh," New York Times Magazine, July 6, 2008, including descriptions of Limbaugh's studio interactions with Golden
 Transcript of Golden's on-air commentary (as "Bo Snerdley") in his satirical role as Official Criticizer of Barack Obama, August 26, 2008
 Transcript of Golden's on-air commentary (as "Bo Snerdley") on the controversy involving Limbaugh's involvement with a group seeking ownership of the St. Louis Rams professional football team, October 16, 2009 
 "Radio Panel Gets Stuck in Rush Hour," New York Daily News, August 15, 1996
  "If You Can't Get Enough Talk, Tune Into New Internet Shows," New York Times, November 19, 1998
 "Rush Limbaugh's Right Hand Man is Black," David Love, The Grio, August 31, 2011

References

External links
 

African-American radio personalities
African-American Christians
American political commentators
American radio producers

American radio executives

The Rush Limbaugh Show
Black conservatism in the United States
21st-century African-American people
20th-century African-American people

Year of birth uncertain
Living people
1950s births